The Beijing Times was a Chinese newspaper published in Beijing that is a part of the People's Daily Group. When it started in 2001 it had 12% of the Beijing newspaper market and its percentage increased afterwards. Tang Wenfang and Shanto Iyengar, authors of Political Communication China Media, described the paper as one of the "commercialized papers emerging in the early 2000s".

On April 10, 2013, the Beijing Times accused the company Nongfu Spring of intentionally not adopting Chinese national water standards and instead adopting the lower standards of Zhejiang province. This started a dispute between the company and the newspaper. In November 2013 the company accused the Beijing Times of defamation and filed a lawsuit in the Beijing Second Intermediate People's Court against the newspaper, demanding 60 million yuan (US$9.85 million).

References

External links
  Beijing Times

People's Daily
Newspapers published in Beijing
2001 establishments in China
Publications established in 2001
Daily newspapers published in China
Defunct newspapers published in China
Publications disestablished in 2017
2017 disestablishments in China